The Robert Lebel Trophy is awarded annually to the team in the Quebec Major Junior Hockey League with the lowest goals against average in the regular season. The trophy is named for Robert Lebel, founding president of the QMJHL, and a former goaltender.

Winners

External links
 QMJHL official site List of trophy winners.

References

Quebec Major Junior Hockey League trophies and awards